Hoult is a surname. Notable people with the surname include: 

 Colin Hoult (born 1979), British comedy actor and writer
 Jack Hoult, English rugby league footballer
 Joseph Hoult (1847–1917), British ship-owner and Member of Parliament for Wirral 1900–1906
 Nicholas Hoult (born 1989), English actor
 Norah Hoult (1898–1984), Irish novelist and short story writer
 Russell Hoult (born 1972), English footballer
 Liam Hoult (born 2002), British Harry Potter Look-alike